Virgin and Child in a Landscape is a 1496-1499 oil on panel painting by Cima da Conegliano, now in the North Carolina Museum of Art, in Raleigh.

Variants
The artist usually produced single compositions, but this work belongs to a group of at least five he produced from a single cartoon:

References

Raleigh
Paintings in the collection of the North Carolina Museum of Art
1490s paintings